Fifty Shades is an adult erotic BDSM romance franchise created by British writer E. L. James. It originated as a fanfic for the young-adult teen romance novel series Twilight by American author Stephenie Meyer. That story was turned into a full-length novel titled Fifty Shades of Grey. It has produced a novel series with an original novel trilogy and two follow-up novels, as well as a film trilogy.

Plot summary
Anastasia Steele, a young college graduate, meets Christian Grey, a young business mogul, and becomes his submissive partner. The series explores the development of their relationship.

Original fan fiction

The Fifty Shades novel trilogy (Fifty Shades of Grey, Fifty Shades Darker, Fifty Shades Freed) was originally written as a fan fiction work in the Twilight fictional universe. It was originally called Master of the Universe and written as Snowdragons Icequeen.

Novel series

The original trilogy, Fifty Shades of Grey, Fifty Shades Darker, Fifty Shades Freed, have been published as an omnibus edition called the "Fifty Shades Trilogy".

Film series

References

External links

 Website: http://50shades.com

 
Mass media franchises
BDSM-related mass media
Women's erotica and pornography
Obscenity controversies 
Works based on Twilight (novel series)
Fan fiction works